Peggle is an American  series of casual puzzle video games created by PopCap Games. Peggle was released initially for desktop in 2007, followed by three sequels: Peggle Nights (2008), Peggle 2 (2013), and Peggle Blast (2014). In 2020, Blast was released to Pogo.com. Spin-off games include Peggle Extreme (2007) and Peggle World of Warcraft Edition (2009). The Peggle franchise has been downloaded more than 50 million times.

Games 
Main series

 Peggle (2007)
 Peggle Nights (2008)
 Peggle: Dual Shot (2009)
 Peggle 2 (2013)
 Peggle Blast (2014, HD 2020)

Spin-offs

 Peggle Extreme (2007)
 Peggle World of Warcraft Edition (2009)

Development 
Peggle was originally envisioned by PopCap's studio director, Sukhbir Sidhu, who was inspired by pachinko machines. However, he recognized that pachinko was mostly luck-based, and would not translate well into a video game. After seeing a 2D game engine created by PopCap programmer Brian Rothstein, Sidhu was able to realize his game and worked with Rothstein for the first five months of its development before bringing in additional programmers. Initial designs focused on bringing together elements of pachinko with Breakout. The team initially incorporated a "rapid-fire" mechanic used in pachinko, along with numerous moving targets, but found this made the levels either too fast-paced or too demanding of the player. They found over time that a static field of pegs provided a more enjoyable experience for the player; the path of the ball would be more predictable, leading to the gameplay mechanic requiring only a random subset of orange pegs to be cleared. Once the team had established the core mechanics, they brought on character artist Walter Wilson, background artist Marcia Broderick and an additional coder, Eric Tams, to help complete Peggle within its two-year development period. Even with their game established, Sidhu and Rothstein faced internal challenges at PopCap to increase the level of interactivity with the game, but they defended their vision of the game.

References 

Electronic Arts franchises
Casual games
Video game franchises
Video game franchises introduced in 2007
PopCap games
Pachinko video games